Henry Neitz "Hennie" Smoyer (April 25, 1890 – February 28, 1958) was a Major League Baseball shortstop and third baseman who played in  with the St. Louis Browns.

External links

1890 births
1958 deaths
Albright Lions baseball players
Major League Baseball shortstops
Major League Baseball third basemen
Baseball players from Pennsylvania
St. Louis Browns players
Harrisburg Senators players